Kay Cousins Johnson (May 28, 1923 - January 20, 1980) was an American actress and screenwriter born in Los Angeles, California. Born Kay Levy, she is known for her appearances in television series such as The Twilight Zone, Wagon Train, and I Led 3 Lives, in addition to writing the 1978 horror film Jennifer.

Acting work 

 Climax! (1956) (TV)
 Private Secretary (1956) (TV)
 I Led 3 Lives (1956) (TV)
 Studio 57 (1958) (TV)
 Wagon Train (1958) (TV)
 M Squad (1958) (TV)
 The Rifleman (1959) (TV)
 The Twilight Zone (1960) (TV)
 Ben Casey (1964) (TV)
 The Restless Ones (1965)
 The Wild Wild West (1967) (TV)

Writing work 

 ABC Afterschool Specials (1976 episode: "Mighty Moose and the Quarterback Kid")
 Jennifer (1978)

Personal life 
Cousins studied at the Actors' Lab in Hollywood, where she met and married Russell Johnson, the actor who played the Professor on Gilligan's Island. The couple had two children together, a daughter Kim and a son David.

References

External links

1923 births
1980 deaths
American actresses
American screenwriters